Zidava was a Dacian fortified town in present-day Alba County, in the Transylvanian region of Romania.

References

Dacian towns
Dacian fortresses in Alba County
Historic monuments in Alba County